Noor Mohammad Saqib is the current Minister of Hajj and Awqaf in Afghanistan. He also previously served as chief justice of the Supreme Court during the 1996–2001 rule of the Islamic Emirate of Afghanistan.

Education
Saqib studied at Darul Uloom Haqqania in Pakistan and had won first positions both in his seminary and in the Federation of Madrassas of Pakistan in the final Hadith examination. A year before the Hadith study, he studied at Madrasa Anwar-ul-Uloom, Central Jamia Masjid, Gujranwala, where he studied Mishkat Shareef and Hidayah from Qazi Hamidullah Khan and Jalalin Sharif from Zahid Ur Rashdi.

References

Living people
Year of birth missing (living people)
Taliban government ministers of Afghanistan
Afghan judges
Sharia judges
Darul Uloom Haqqania alumni
Supreme Court Justices of Afghanistan